Paleostyloidea is an extinct superfamily of fossil sea snails, marine gastropod mollusks in the clade Caenogastropoda.

Families
Families within the superfamily Paleostyloidea are as follows:
 † Family Palaeostylidae
 † Family Goniasmatidae
 † Family Pithodeidae

References